Tegula globulus is a species of sea snail, a marine gastropod mollusk in the family Tegulidae.

Description
The size of its shell is 11 mm.

Distribution
This marine species is common under or on rocks at high-tide level off Southern California, United States; and Baja California, Mexico.

References

External links
 To World Register of Marine Species
 

globulus
Gastropods described in 1857